Curt Siodmak (August 10, 1902 –  September 2, 2000) was a German-American novelist and screenwriter. He is known for his work in the horror and science fiction film genres, with such films as The Wolf Man and Donovan's Brain (the latter adapted from his novel of the same name). He was the younger brother of noir director Robert Siodmak.

Life and career
Siodmak was born Kurt Siodmak in Dresden, Germany, the son of Rosa Philippine (née Blum) and Ignatz Siodmak. His parents were both from Jewish families in Leipzig. Siodmak acquired a degree in mathematics before beginning to write novels. He invested early royalties earned by his first books in the 1929 movie Menschen am Sonntag, a documentary-style chronicle of the lives of four Berliners on a Sunday based on their own lives. The movie was co-directed by Curt Siodmak's older brother Robert Siodmak and Edgar G. Ulmer, with a script by Billy Wilder in collaboration with Fred Zinnemann and cameraman Eugen Schüfftan. Siodmak was the nephew of film producer Seymour Nebenzal, who funded Menschen am Sonntag with funds borrowed from his father, Heinrich Nebenzahl.

In the following years Siodmak wrote many novels, screenplays, and short stories, including the novel F.P.1 antwortet nicht (F.P.1 Doesn't Answer) (1932) which was adapted into a film featuring Hans Albers and Peter Lorre.

Siodmak decided to emigrate after hearing an anti-Semitic tirade by the Nazi propaganda minister Joseph Goebbels, and departed for England where he made a living as a screenwriter before moving to the United States in 1937. His big break in Hollywood came with the screenplay for The Wolf Man (1941), starring Lon Chaney, Jr., which established this fictional creature as the most popular movie monster after Dracula and Frankenstein's monster. In the film, Siodmak created several werewolf "legends" — being marked by a pentagram; being practically immortal apart from being struck/shot by silver implements/bullets; and the famous verse:
Even a man who is pure in heart,
And says his prayers by night
May become a wolf when the wolfsbane blooms
And the autumn moon is bright
(The last line was changed in the sequels to "And the moon is full and bright".)

Siodmak's science-fiction novel Donovan's Brain (1942) was a bestseller that was translated into many languages and was adapted for the cinema several times, beginning in 1943 with The Lady and the Monster, then 1953's Donovan's Brain and 1962's The Brain. Other  films he wrote the screenplays for include Earth vs. the Flying Saucers, I Walked with a Zombie and The Beast with Five Fingers. An extensive interview with Siodmak about his career in both Germany and Hollywood is found in Eric Leif Davin's Pioneers of Wonder. In the plots of his work, Siodmak utilised the latest scientific findings combining those with pseudo-scientific motifs like the Jekyll and Hyde complex, the Nazi trauma and the East–West dichotomy.

In 1998, he won the Berlinale Camera at the 48th Berlin International Film Festival.

Siodmak died in his sleep on September 2, 2000, at his home in Three Rivers, California.

Works

Novels
 F.P.1 Doesn't Answer (1933)
 Black Friday (1939)
 Donovan's Brain (1942)
 The Beast with Five Fingers (1945)
 Whomsoever I Shall Kiss (1952)
 Riders to the Stars (1954) (novelisation of the film Riders to the Stars)
 Skyport (1959)
 For Kings Only (1964)
 Hauser's Memory (1968)
 The Third Ear (1971)
 City in the Sky (1974)
 Frankenstein Meets Wolfman (1981)(novelisation of the film Frankenstein Meets the Wolf Man)
 Gabriel's Body (1991)

Short stories
 The Eggs from Lake Tanganyika (1926)
 Variation of a Theme (1972)
 The P Factor (1976)
 Experiment with Evil (1985)

Non fiction
 Even a Man Who Is Pure in Heart: The Life of a Writer, Not Always to His Liking (1997)
 Wolf Man's Maker (2001) (Posthumous autobiography)

Filmography

Film adaptations
 , directed by Alfred Zeisler (1930, based on the novel Schuß im Tonfilmatelier)
 F.P.1 antwortet nicht, directed by Karl Hartl (1932, based on the novel F.P.1 antwortet nicht)
 I.F.1 ne répond plus, directed by Karl Hartl (1933, based on the novel F.P.1 antwortet nicht)
 F.P.1, directed by Karl Hartl (1933, based on the novel F.P.1 antwortet nicht)
 Girls Will Be Boys, directed by Marcel Varnel (1934, based on the play The Last Lord)
 The Lady and the Monster, directed by George Sherman (1944, based on the novel Donovan's Brain)
 Donovan's Brain, directed by Felix E. Feist (1953, based on the novel Donovan's Brain)
 Studio One: Donovan's Brain (1955, TV series episode, based on the novel Donovan's Brain)
 The Brain, directed by Freddie Francis (1962, based on the novel Donovan's Brain)
 Hauser's Memory, directed by Boris Sagal (1970, TV film, based on the novel Hauser's Memory)
 Der Heiligenschein, directed by Heinz Schirk (1977, TV film, based on a short story by Curt Siodmak)

References

External links

Siodmak on Siodmak

1902 births
2000 deaths
Writers from Dresden
20th-century German novelists
German screenwriters
German male screenwriters
German male short story writers
German short story writers
Jewish emigrants from Nazi Germany to the United States
Jewish American writers
Exilliteratur writers
20th-century American novelists
American science fiction writers
American male novelists
American male screenwriters
German male novelists
20th-century German short story writers
20th-century German male writers
20th-century American male writers
Film people from Dresden
20th-century American screenwriters
20th-century American Jews